The following highways are numbered 975:

United States